Spodnji Čačič is a small settlement in the Municipality of Osilnica in southern Slovenia. The area is part of the traditional region of Lower Carniola and is now included in the Southeast Slovenia Statistical Region.

The local church in the settlement is dedicated to Saint Nicholas and belongs to the Parish of Osilnica. It was first mentioned in documents dating to 1526. In 1823 it was extended and in 1942 it was burned down together with the whole settlement. After 1945 it was rebuilt.

References

External links
Spodnji Čačič on Geopedia

Populated places in the Municipality of Osilnica